Maxwell Emmett "Pat" Buttram (June 19, 1915 – January 8, 1994) was an American character actor. Buttram was known for playing the sidekick of Gene Autry and for playing the character of Mr. Haney in the television series Green Acres. He had a distinctive voice that, in his own words, "never quite made it through puberty."

Early life 
Buttram was born on June 19, 1915, in Addison, Alabama, to Wilson McDaniel Buttram, a Methodist minister, and his wife Mary Emmett Maxwell. He had an older brother, Augustus McDaniel Buttram, and five other elder siblings. When "Pat" Buttram was a year old, his father was transferred to Nauvoo, Alabama. Buttram graduated from Mortimer Jordan High School, then located in Morris, Alabama, then entered Birmingham–Southern College to study for the Methodist ministry.

Career 
Buttram performed in college plays and on a local radio station, then became a regular on the National Barn Dance broadcast on WLS (AM) in Chicago. He also had his own program on CBS.

Buttram went to Hollywood in the 1940s and became a sidekick to Roy Rogers. However,  because Rogers already had two regulars, Buttram was dropped.

He was then picked by Gene Autry, recently returned from his World War II service in the U.S. Army Air Corps, to work with him. Buttram co-starred with Autry in more than 40 films and in over 100 episodes of Autry's television show. Buttram's first Autry film was The Strawberry Roan in 1948. In the late 1940s, Buttram joined Autry on his radio show Melody Ranch and then on television with The Gene Autry Show. During the first television season, Buttram went by Pat or Patrick, with a variety of last names. From the second season forward, he used his own name.

Buttram also played Mr. Eustace Haney in the 1965–1971 television comedy Green Acres. He did voice work for several Disney animated features, playing Napoleon (hound dog) in The Aristocats, the Sheriff of Nottingham (a wolf) in Robin Hood, Luke (muskrat) in The Rescuers, Chief (hunting dog) in The Fox and the Hound, and one of the Toon bullets in Who Framed Roger Rabbit. He had a recurring role as the voice of Cactus Jake on Garfield and Friends. One of his later roles was a cameo in Back to the Future Part III. His final voice-over was A Goofy Movie, released a year after his death. Buttram is credited as one of the writers on the Hee Haw television show for two episodes in 1969 and 1970.

Buttram made the oft-quoted observation about the 1971 "rural purge", in which CBS canceled many programs with a rural theme or setting: "CBS canceled everything with a tree in it – including Lassie," referring to the cancellations of Green Acres, The Beverly Hillbillies and Petticoat Junction.

Personal life 
In 1936, Buttram married Dorothy McFadden. The couple adopted a daughter but divorced in 1946. In 1952, he married actress Sheila Ryan; the marriage ended with her death in 1975. They had a daughter named Kathrine (nicknamed Kerry), born in 1954. Buttram retired from acting in 1980 and made his home in his native Winston County, Alabama. However, he returned to California, where he made frequent personal appearances.

Buttram was a staunch Republican who helped Ronald Reagan spice up his speeches with political quips. In 1993, Buttram expressed surprise that with the inauguration of Bill Clinton and Al Gore as president of the United States and vice president of the United States, respectively, so many Hollywood actors were "taken with that whole country-boy image they tried to project". According to his niece Mary Buttram Young, "Uncle Pat would always say 'I'm from Alabama – I can see right through that'."

Death 
Buttram died in 1994 at the age of 78 of kidney failure at the UCLA Medical Center in Los Angeles. He is interred at the cemetery at the Maxwell Chapel United Methodist Church in the Pebble community near Haleyville, Alabama.

In 1988, Buttram was honored with a star on the Hollywood Walk of Fame and one on the "Alabama Stars of Fame" in Birmingham, Alabama.

Filmography

Partial television credits

See also

References 
Notes

Further reading
 Grabman, Sandra. Pat Buttram, the Rocking Chair Humorist. Boalsburg: BearManor Media, 2006. .

External links 
 
 
 Pat Buttram photos and links

1915 births
1994 deaths
20th-century American male actors
American humorists
American male film actors
American male radio actors
American male television actors
American male voice actors
American United Methodists
Birmingham–Southern College alumni
California Republicans
Deaths from kidney failure
Male actors from Alabama
Male Western (genre) film actors
People from Winston County, Alabama
20th-century Methodists